Ihor Romanovych Pokydko (born 15 February 1965) is a Ukrainian professional football referee and a former player. 

As a player, he made his professional debut in the Soviet Second League in 1988 for FC Nyva Ternopil. Following the dissolution of the Soviet Union and admission of Nyva to the top tier, in 1992 he debut in the Vyshcha Liha.

As a referee, he started already in 1993 serving matches of regional competitions. Since 1998 Pokydko was refereeing for professional competitions retiring in 2011.

International career
He made his only Ukraine national football team appearance on 27 June 1992 in an away friendly against the United States, a 0–0 away draw.

References

1965 births
Living people
Sportspeople from Ternopil
Soviet footballers
Ukrainian footballers
Ukraine international footballers
NK Veres Rivne players
FC Nyva Ternopil players
Ukrainian Premier League players
Ukrainian football referees
Association football defenders